Gex: Enter the Gecko is a platform game and the second installment of the Gex video game series, released in 1998 and 1999 for the PlayStation, Nintendo 64, Microsoft Windows, and Game Boy Color. Its protagonist, Gex, a TV-binging, wisecracking gecko, is voiced by Dana Gould in the North American version, Leslie Phillips in the European release, and Mitsuo Senda in the Japanese release. Gex seeks to collect three types of remotes to unlock different TVs in the overworld that aid in the fight against his arch-nemesis, Rez.

After creating the original Gex, which released for the 3DO Interactive Multiplayer, PC, Sega Saturn, and PlayStation in 1995, developer Crystal Dynamics sought a sequel in the form of a 3D platform video game in the style of Super Mario 64. The Gex model was rebuilt with this perspective in mind, and much of the game's humor was inspired by Fox's animated television series The Simpsons, on which script writer Rob Cohen had previously worked as a writer. Hundreds of voice-overs were recorded for the character Gex, but hardware constraints forced the Nintendo 64 version of the game to include only around one hundred samples. The Nintendo 64 release, due to hardware limitations, features six fewer levels than its PlayStation counterpart, but the release also includes one exclusive level, "Gecques Cousteau".

Critical reception of Gex: Enter the Gecko was mostly positive. Critics' main concerns centered on the game's camera, graphics, low-polygon enemies, and simplicity. The game was followed by 1999's Gex 3: Deep Cover Gecko, which released on the PlayStation, Nintendo 64, and Game Boy Color.

Gameplay

Enter the Gecko, the first 3D platform game in the Gex franchise, allows the player to choose from three camera control options: automatic, semi-automatic, and manual. The player controls Gex (voiced by comedian Dana Gould in the North American release, Leslie Phillips in the European release, and Mitsuo Senda in the Japanese release), who has spent much of his time watching television. His dialogue consists of references to popular culture from the late 1980s and 1990s, usually spoken when he enters a level, attacks, dies, or collects items. Dialogue and scenes were heavily cut for the Nintendo 64 version due to hardware limitations.

Gex's move set includes a tail whip attack, a tail bounce, and a flying karate kick. His ability to climb certain walls and ceilings is a quality borrowed from the real-life gecko on which Gex is based. Gex may use his tail whip around levels to break small TV sets that contain different colored flies, which, when consumed, can add an extra health point, add an extra life, temporarily unlock additional moves, or mark a checkpoint in the level if the player runs out of health. Specific stages can require Gex to collect power-ups to move throughout the level or to just stay alive, as is the case with the outer space stages in which Gex must collect oxygen for his astronaut suit. While the majority of enemies can be defeated using Gex's move set, others can only be eliminated when Gex manipulates objects or machinery around him. For example, a dragon in a Kung Fu level early in the game can only be slain after Gex targets it with a cannon.

TV sets in the game's hub world act as entry points to different stages, which parody popular culture, such as Looney Tunes and Star Wars. Excluding bonus stages, each level has a set number of red remotes for Gex to collect along with silver remotes, which are awarded for collecting 120 collectibles or discovering a hidden secret. Red remotes can be collected after standing on the green button in front of in-world television screens after completing level-specific objectives, which can be completed in any order regardless of which one is chosen on the level screen. Collecting red remotes unlocks new areas in the hub world along with bonus and boss levels, which reward a gold remote upon completion. Collecting all remotes in every stage unlocks a special ending showcasing the game's concept art.

Nintendo 64 version
Due to the console's cartridge storage limitations, six levels were removed, which include three secret levels ("Lava Daba Doo", "Texas Chainsaw Manicure", and "Mazed and Confused"), one normal level ("Poltergex"), and two bonus levels ("I Got the Reruns" and "Trouble in Uranus"). Other changes include fewer bonus levels, fewer quotes, and altered sound effects.

Plot
Following his victory over Rez in the Media Dimension, Gex has retired from the public eye and turned to solitude.

Two years later, his quiet life is soon turned upside down when one day he was watching television when all of a sudden, it goes blank and Rez's image begins flashing on the screen. Two government agents also appear and abduct Gex to their headquarters, in which Gex is interrogated. The agents explain that Rez has returned and they need his help in taking him down again. Gex refuses, saying that he has already saved the world once and that they should try to find someone else. When the agents make a fair negotiation for a huge sum of cash and gadgets, Gex tells them everything. He accepts the mission, to which he leaves the building and is then accosted by a female agent who introduces herself as Agent Xtra and wishes him good luck.

After navigating numerous television channels in the Media Dimension, Gex finally confronts Rez and the two battle once again until Gex drops a huge television set on Rez severely weakening him. In desperation, Rez tells Gex through a television that he is his father. Gex merely turns the television off. Whether or not he believes Rez is unknown. In the final scene, Gex shares a hotel room with Nikki from the Pandemonium series.

Development

In early 1997, Crystal Dynamics announced that they were working on a 3D sequel to Gex in the style of Super Mario 64. Crystal Dynamics originally wanted to relaunch the character with the technology available at the time. Rather than a grouping of polygons, Gex was built with a full skeletal system, with more bones than a real gecko, and a 'skin' stretched over-top to eliminate pop and tearing. This also allowed him to move his mouth along with the voiced dialogue.

The Simpsons made for a noteworthy inspiration for the comedy set-ups based upon the show's popular style of humor. Rob Cohen, a writer from The Simpsons, worked on the script for Gex: Enter the Gecko, particularly Gex's one-liners. The end result of the idea gave Dana Gould over 700 voice-overs for Gex, while giving the character different costumes in order to suit the mood of the levels. When the game was released for the Nintendo 64, over 500 voice-overs from the PC and PlayStation versions were cut out from the original version, giving the Nintendo 64 version roughly over 100 samples to work with for the purpose of the hardware's limitations at the time of development. When Gould was being interviewed for the game, he explained how Gex in the third dimension differed from other platform games at the time. Gould said "The character's natural God-given abilities lend themselves extremely well to designing 3D gameplay." Gould reprised the role of Gex in the game for the American market, although the British version featured the voice of Leslie Phillips instead.

The designers put heavy emphasis on variety in the levels, in order to both give each world a different feel and help the player find their way around by creating recognizably unique landmarks.

In mid-1997 Crystal Dynamics signed an agreement for Midway Games to publish the game for the PlayStation and Nintendo 64.

Reception

Reviews for the original release of Gex: Enter the Gecko for PlayStation ranged from mixed to positive. On aggregating review website GameRankings, the PlayStation version held an 82% based on 15 reviews. Critics almost unanimously described the levels as extremely well-designed, varied, and expansive. Dan Hsu of Electronic Gaming Monthly (EGM) said that ninety percent of what made Gex: Enter the Gecko fun was the level design with its wealth of imagination and diverse, humorous settings. IGN said the variety of objectives in each level was what set the game above most platformers. The graphics were also uniformly praised, with Jeff Gerstmann of GameSpot describing the overall look and frame rate as "about as close to Mario 64 as you'll ever get on a PlayStation" and Hsu's co-reviewer John Ricciardi commenting that "Gex's gorgeous graphics really exemplify just how far the PS has come since its release. Loads of beautiful textures, seamless animation, great lighting effects – the game is just a joy to look at."

Response to the virtual camera was more mixed. IGN and GamePro both hailed it as a major step forward for 3D gaming cameras, while EGM's reviewers remarked that, while the virtual camera was a valiant effort and could be made to work, it still was annoying at times. Next Generation, while similarly noting that the problems with camera angles in 3D gaming had yet to be solved by any game and that the developers had at least made an effort at a fix, felt that these ongoing problems in Gex: Enter the Gecko by themselves made it impossible to wholeheartedly recommend the game.

While the majority of reviewers praised the game's humor and personality, Gerstmann found the jokes so lame that they dragged the entire game down to a mediocre level. He added that "You can turn the commentary down or off, but considering that the game's entire selling point is based around these pathetic one-liners, you kind of feel obligated to leave them on." IGN had a much more positive overall assessment: "In the end, Gex is a surprising amount of fun, and gamers will like it because of its off-beat humor, large levels and great replay value."

GamePro called the game "A must-own for platform fans" and gave it a 4.5 out of 5 for control and a perfect 5.0 in every other category (graphics, sound, and fun factor). Game.EXE said that it lacked attention to detail and care. A Game World Navigator reviewer praised the graphics, noting that the backgrounds are detailed, but noticed that the monsters have few polygons. The reviewer complained about the bad behavior of the camera, and eventually concluded that the game is worth playing. Dmitriy Estrin, reviewer of a Strana Igr magazine, commented on the graphics, saying that the "developers skillfully managed the resources available to them", but he also noticed that the game had "too much simplicity in all aspects of the gameplay".

The Nintendo 64 version received mostly mixed reviews, holding a 61% on GameRankings based on 12 reviews. Upon the PC version's initial release, USA Today gave the game 4 out of 5 stars.

Notes

References

External links

 
 

1998 video games
3D platform games
Action-adventure games
Crystal Dynamics games
Game Boy Color games
Gex (series)
Midway video games
Nintendo 64 games
PlayStation (console) games
Realtime Associates games
Video games developed in the United States
Video games scored by Kurt Harland
Windows games
Science fiction video games